Irkliiv rural hromada is a hromada of Ukraine, in Zolotonosha Raion, Cherkasy Oblast. Its administrative center is Irkliiv. It was formed on 29 March 2017 by merging Irkliiv and Melnykiv village councils in Chornobai Raion. On 17 July 2020, it was assigned to Zolotonosha Raion in accordance with Verkhovna Rada resolution No. 807-IX. The area of the hromada is 926.2 km2, and its population is 

Until 18 July 2020, the hromada belonged to Chornobai Raion. The raion was abolished in July 2020 as part of the administrative reform of Ukraine, which reduced the number of raions of Cherkasy Oblast to four. The area of Chornobai Raion was merged into Zolotonosha Raion.

Structure 
The hromada contains 16 village councils:

 Vasiutynska
 Veremiivska
 Zhovnynska
 Irkliivska
 Klishchynska
 Krutkivska
 Lykholitska
 Liashchivska
 Melnykivska
 Moskalenkivska
 Pershotravneva
 Prydniprovska
 Revbynska
 Starokovraiska
 Stepivska
 Tymchenkivska

26 communities became part of the hromada.

Including 24 villages:

 Batalyi
 Vasiutyntsi
 Veremiivka 
 Voronnytsi 
 Zhovnyne 
 Zahorodyshche 
 Irkliiv 
 Klishchyntsi 
 Kovrai 
 Krutky 
 Lykholity 
 Liashchivka
 Melnyky 
 Moskalenky
 Pershotravneve
 Prydniprovske 
 Revbyntsi 
 Skorodystyk 
 Staryi Kovrai
 Stepove
 Tymchenky
 Chervonohirka
 Chervonokhyzhyntsi
 Chekhivka

And 2 settlements:

 Zhuravlyne
 Myrne

References 

2017 establishments in Ukraine
Hromadas of Zolotonosha Raion